Parascender Technologies, Inc. (usually just referred to as Parascender) was an American aircraft manufacturer based in Kissimmee, Florida, founded by RB Brady and Teri Brady in 1989. The company specialized in the design and manufacture of powered parachutes in the form of kits for amateur construction.

The company seems to have gone out of business in September 2004.

The company produced a line of powered parachutes, including the single place Parascender I introduced in 1989, the two seat Parascender II introduced in 1990 and the Parascender Para-Ag Single seat agricultural application powered parachute.

Controversy
The company's business practices were controversial. In December 2002 the Aero News Network (ANN) reported that the company had been the subject of "a number of lawsuits, criminal complaints, and a great many civil complaints to better business bureaus and State's Attorneys General", described the founder as a "convicted felon" and concluded "ANN strongly recommends that Parascender Technologies be avoided (like a cliche, or like the plague…) as a candidate for flight training, PPC dealership agreements, powered parachute equipment, or PPC airframe purchases. We simply have too extensive and persuasive a record of this company's false statements, frauds and other non-performance to remotely believe that there is anything about them that can be recommended."

Aircraft

References

External links
 - former location
Company website archives on Archive.org

Defunct aircraft manufacturers of the United States
Ultralight aircraft
Homebuilt aircraft
Powered parachutes
Companies based in Florida
1989 establishments in Florida
2004 disestablishments in Florida
American companies established in 1989
American companies disestablished in 2004
Manufacturing companies established in 1989